Gridiron NSW, originally known as NSW Gridiron Football League (NSWGFL) until 2007, is the governing body for American football (otherwise known as 'gridiron') in the state of New South Wales, Australia.

Arguably the longest tenured American football league in Australia, Gridiron NSW took over from the Australian American Football Conference (AAFC) after its inaugural 1984 season and ultimately survived a threat from the breakaway NSW Premier State Gridiron League between 1993 and 1996.

The teams from the NSW Premier State Gridiron League returned to the NSW Gridiron Football League prior to the commencement of the 1997 season and since that time, Gridiron NSW has continued to expand as the sport has enjoyed increasing popularity both in New South Wales and Australia generally.

Gridiron NSW currently consists of four divisions: Division 1 (Men 18+ years), Women (18+ years), Colts (16–19 years) and Juniors (8–15 years).

The two top teams in each division (with the exception of the Juniors) participate in the Waratah Bowl (Men), Opal Bowl (Women) and the Kookaburra Bowl (Colts) respectively. These games and also known as the State Finals.

The team with the most Waratah Bowl championships is the Sydney University Lions, who have won 21 in total, including 16 straight championships between 2003 and 2018 inclusive. This streak was broken when the UNSW Raiders were defeated by the Northern Sydney Rebels 38-32 in the 2019 Waratah Bowl.

Each season the best players across the league are selected to represent New South Wales at the Australian Gridiron League National Championships in representative teams known as the NSW Wolfpack (Men), the Coyotes (Women) and the Wolverines (Colts) respectively.

Following the demise of the Newcastle Kings, the Hunter Gridiron League was launched as a separate competition for players in the Newcastle and Hunter Valley area of NSW.

League members

Current members

UNSW Raiders
Central Coast Sharks
Northern Sydney Rebels
Nepean Ducks
Sutherland Seahawks
Sydney University Lions
UTS Gridiron
West Sydney Pirates
Wollongong Mustangs

Former members (senior teams)
Army
Astros
Blacktown Vikings
Canberra Sabretooths
Canterbury Cougars
Concord Jaguars
Eastern Suburbs Buccaneers
Fairfield Argonauts
Hills District Eagles
Manly Redbacks
Newcastle Kings
Newcastle Uni Thunder
North Western Rebels
Parramatta Bears
Parramatta Saxons
Penrith Outlaws
Ryde Spartans
St George Fireballs
Tempe Jets/Mascot Jets
Western Wolverines
Newcastle Cobras
North Western Sydney Predators
Newcastle Kings

Former members (junior teams)

Blacktown Starrs 
Caringbah Chargers
Casula Bears
Eastside Colts
Lansvale Trojans
North Shore Falcons
Penrith City Chiefs
Penrith Wolverines
North Western Sydney American Football Club

Division One Championship Game history

NSW Premier State Gridiron League

The NSW Premier State Gridiron League (NSWPSGL) was formed by disgruntled members of the NSWGFL, which was the only American Football league in NSW at the time. It operated between 1993 and 1996. The affiliated NSW Premier State Youth Gridiron League (NSWPSYGL), which was the first junior gridiron competition in Australia, was also conducted under its administration.

In its inaugural 1993 season, the league consisted of 6 teams – Bondi Raiders, Liverpool Pirates, L.U.S.C. Argonauts, Mascot Jets, Newcastle Cobras and Wollongong Mustangs. Prior to the commencement of the 1997 season, and after only four seasons, the league was disbanded and its teams rejoined what was then the NSW Gridiron Football League.

NSW Premier State Youth Gridiron League

The origins of the NSW Premier State Youth Gridiron League (NSWPSYGL) may be traced to the establishment in 1991 of the first two junior teams in New South Wales: Blacktown Starrs and Penrith Wolverines. The teams played two exhibition games at Penrith Park and Parramatta Stadium in June and July 1991 before games between touring US Down Under Bowl high school teams from North Dakota and Colorado.

In its inaugural 1993 season, the Penrith City Chiefs defeated the North Shore Falcons 32-0 in the State Championship Game.

In 1994, the NSWPSYGL consisted of 5 teams: Caringbah Chargers, Eastside Colts, Lansvale Trojans, North Shore Falcons and Penrith City Chiefs. The 1994 season ended with the Penrith City Chiefs being crowned State Champions following an amazing 13-12 comeback victory against the North Shore Falcons in the State Championship Game on 29 May 1994.

The Penrith City Chiefs completed a three-peat in the 1995 season and in the NSWPSYGL’s final season in 1996, the newly formed Casula Bears won the State Championship.

See also
Gridiron Australia

References

External links
Gridiron NSW official site

Sports governing bodies in New South Wales
New
Sports organizations established in 1984
1984 establishments in Australia